Deviation analysis may mean;

 in statistics; measurement of the absolute difference between any one number in a set and the mean of the set.
 in social psychology; monitoring of the behavior of people or objects within systems to measure compliance with expected or desired norms in order to trigger alerts, identity users or spot anomalies.

Analysis